Zhongshan Township is a township in Mangshi, Yunnan, China. It is adjacent to Myanmar.

Administrative division
As of December 2015, the township is divided into 5 villages: 
 Mangbing
 Xiaoshuijing
 Huangjiazhai
 Saigang
 Muchengpo

Economy
The local economy is primarily based upon agriculture and animal husbandry.

Education
 Zhongshan Township Middle School
 Zhongshan Township Central Primary School

Transport
The Mengxiao Road passes across the township east to west.

References

Divisions of Mangshi